Idris Kadded Benoit (born 2 November 1998) is a French footballer who plays as a forward for FC 93. He was previously with Scottish club Dundee United in Scotland. A former youth player with Nice, he also played in France for Vaulx-en-Velin.

Playing career
Kadded was born in Lyon and played for Nice as a youth player. He made one appearance for the club's reserve team in National 2, against Hyères in January 2017. After being released by Nice, he joined Vaulx-en-Velin in National 3 prior to the 2017–18 season. Having made six league appearances without scoring, he went on trial to Scottish Championship club Dundee United in January 2018 and was subsequently offered a contract. Kadded signed as an amateur for the rest of the season with Dundee United on 20 January 2018, and made his debut the same day as a substitute in a Scottish Cup tie against Alloa Athletic. Manager Csaba László stated that, despite his amateur status, he would consider Kadded as a first team player. Kadded left the club at the end of the season, having made only one further substitute appearance.

On 1 January 2019, Kadded signed a six-month contract with Nottingham Forest.

After returning to France with Red Star B for a season, Kadded signed with Lusitanos Saint-Maur on 15 July 2020.

Personal life
Born in France, Kadded is of Algerian descent.

References

External links

Living people
1998 births
Footballers from Lyon
French footballers
French sportspeople of Algerian descent
Association football forwards
OGC Nice players
Dundee United F.C. players
Nottingham Forest F.C. players
Red Star F.C. players
US Lusitanos Saint-Maur players
FC Vaulx-en-Velin players
Scottish Professional Football League players
French expatriate footballers
Expatriate footballers in Scotland